Christopher Marrow (born 27 June 1996) is a South African first-class cricketer. He was included in the South Western Districts cricket team squad for the 2016 Africa T20 Cup. He made his List A debut for South Western Districts in the 2016–17 CSA Provincial One-Day Challenge on 16 October 2016.

References

External links
 

1996 births
Living people
South African cricketers
South Western Districts cricketers
Cricketers from Bloemfontein